is an action-adventure video game with puzzle elements, developed by Game Republic and published by Namco Bandai Games. It was released on November 23, 2010 in North America.

Plot
The story is set in a once prosperous and fruitful kingdom, which is overtaken by a mysterious "Darkness" and thrown into disarray. While many citizens attempted to explore and find out what's going on, they were never to be seen again, and the decay continued. To cleanse this forsaken kingdom  of the darkness, a young thief sets out to find and free the mythical Majin - an incredibly powerful mystical beast, to reclaim its power and restore the land to its former glory.

Gameplay
The game is an action/platformer, with puzzle elements thrown in at different intervals. Players control the thief, Tepeu, while the Majin, Teotl, is A.I. controlled. Though the player takes no direct control over Teotl, they can give him commands, which are often used for solving puzzles or during combat.

As the game progresses, Teotl will gain powers, such as the ability to produce electricity. These elements will be used both in combat and puzzle solving.

The game is intended to emphasize the differences in Tepeu and Teotl. For example, at certain points, the characters will be separated and Tepeu must dispatch enemies using stealth, as he does not have the strength Teotl does.

Development
The game was first announced during Namco Bandai's press briefing in Gamescom 2009 trade show. Takahiro Sasanoi, director for Tekken 6, also served as the director for this game. The original title was Majin: The Fallen Realm however, this was later changed during development. Although the game shares many conceptual similarities with Team Ico's The Last Guardian, Namco Bandai states that Majin and the Forsaken Kingdom "was in development long before [The] Last Guardian was announced." In March 2010, Namco Bandai confirmed the game for a western release.

Reception

The game received  "mixed or average" reviews on both platforms according to video game review aggregator Metacritic.

The Daily Telegraph gave the X360 version a score of 9 out of 10 and called it "one of the most memorable, enjoyable games I've played this year."  However, 411Mania gave the same version 6.9 out of 10 and stated that it's "worth a weekend rental, or possibly a pick-up if you’re in need of an action-adventure game with some backtracking."  The A.V. Club gave the PS3 version a B− and said that while the game "isn't overtly a kids' game, the translations and voice acting are almost comically silly."

References

External links
 
 Namco-Bandai Games European site 

2010 video games
Action-adventure games
Fantasy video games
Game Republic games
Bandai Namco games
PlayStation 3 games
Puzzle video games
Video games developed in Japan
Video games featuring non-playable protagonists
Video games scored by Toshihiko Sahashi
Xbox 360 games
3D platform games
Single-player video games